Santana High School, located in Santee, California, is part of the Grossmont Union High School District.

History

2001 Shooting

On March 5, 2001, at Santana High School, 15-year-old Charles Andrew Williams shot and killed two students and injured thirteen other people — eleven students and two staff members. Students and faculty were evacuated to a nearby shopping center, and local businesses and churches helped to handle students and parents. Some students said that they heard him saying, weeks before the shootings, that he was "going to pull a Columbine". Retreating to a bathroom, he was apprehended by police. On June 20, 2002, Williams pleaded guilty to all charges against him in an effort to avoid trial. He was sentenced to 50 years to life in prison. He will be eligible for parole in March 2025.

Notable alumni

Leon Bender, 1993, Professional Football Defensive Lineman (NFL), Oakland Raiders
Alex Bowen, 2011, member of United States men's national water polo team
Sharon Davis, 1972, former First Lady of California
Terry Forster, 1970, retired Major League Baseball Relief Pitcher (MLB), Chicago White Sox, Los Angeles Dodgers, Atlanta Braves, Pittsburgh Pirates, Los Angeles Angels
Lon Hinkle, 1967, professional golfer on the PGA Tour
Brian Jones (born 1968), politician serving in the California State Senate
Hayden Penn, 2002, former Major League Baseball Pitcher (MLB), Baltimore Orioles, Florida Marlins, Pittsburgh Pirates
Joe Price, 1974, former Major League Baseball pitcher (MLB), Cincinnati Reds, San Francisco Giants, Boston Red Sox, Baltimore Orioles
Jim Tatum, 1985, former Major League Baseball Infielder (MLB), Milwaukee Brewers, Colorado Rockies, Boston Red Sox, San Diego Padres, New York Mets
Dan Walters, 1994, Major League Baseball player. Catcher for San Diego Padres.
Joe Davenport, 1994, former Major League Baseball Pitcher (MLB), Chicago White Sox, Colorado Rockies

References

Grossmont Union High School District - school mascots and colors
List of California Distinguished Schools in San Diego County

External links

Santana High School
School Shooting

High schools in San Diego County, California
Public high schools in California
Santee, California
Educational institutions established in 1965
1965 establishments in California